Pavel Dorofeyev (born 26 October 2000) is a Russian professional ice hockey winger currently playing for the  Vegas Golden Knights of the National Hockey League (NHL). Dorofeyev was selected in the third round of the 2019 NHL Entry Draft, 79th overall, by the Golden Knights.

Playing career
Dorofeyev played as a youth in his native Russia within the junior ranks of Metallurg Magnitogorsk. Following his second season in the KHL with Metallurg in 2019–20, Dorofeyev was traded by the club along with three other prospects to Traktor Chelyabinsk in exchange for Vladislav Semin on 11 June 2020.

He began the 2020–21 season, with Chelaybinsk affiliate, Chelmet Chelyabinsk of the Supreme Hockey League (VHL), posting 8 goals and 17 points through 36 regular season games. He made his lone KHL appearance with Traktor Chelyabinsk in a 4–2 victory over Kunlun Red Star on 7 October 2020.

With the pandemic delayed North American season approaching, Dorofeyev ended his contract with Traktor Chelyabinsk and was signed to three-year, entry-level contract with the Vegas Golden Knights on 25 January 2021. He was then assigned to join the Golden Knights' new AHL affiliate, the Henderson Silver Knights, in their training camp.

Dorofeyev made his NHL debut with Vegas in their 2021–22 season opening game, a 4–3 victory over the Seattle Kraken.

Career statistics

Regular season and playoffs

International

References

External links

2000 births
Living people
Belye Medvedi Chelyabinsk players
Chelmet Chelyabinsk players
Henderson Silver Knights players
People from Nizhny Tagil
Metallurg Magnitogorsk players
Russian ice hockey forwards
Stalnye Lisy players
Traktor Chelyabinsk players
Vegas Golden Knights draft picks
Vegas Golden Knights players
Sportspeople from Sverdlovsk Oblast